Lovecraft studies is the body of research that has emerged surrounding the works of H. P. Lovecraft. It began with the dissemination of Lovecraft's works by Arkham House during the decades after his death. The scholars in the field sought to establish Lovecraft as a major author of American speculative fiction during its foundational period in the 1970s. After the death of August Derleth, the founder of Arkham House, the field shifted in a direction away from the one that he promoted. L. Sprague de Camp's biography of Lovecraft emerged during this time. While criticized by portions of the fans and scholarship, it played a significant role in his literary rise. During the late 1970s and early 1980s, the scholars were split between traditionalist who supported Derleth's positions on Lovecraft and those who did not. The 1980s and 1990s featured an expansion of the field, including the H. P. Lovecraft Centennial Conference. Memorials to Lovecraft began to appear in his home city of Providence, Rhode Island and his works began to be published by Penguin Classics. S. T. Joshi, a major figure in the field, wrote a biography of Lovecraft that superseded de Camp's work. In 2008, the Library of America, published a volume of Lovecraft's works that solidified the perception that H. P. Lovecraft was now part of the western canon. The NecronomiCon Providence, a biannual scholarly and fan conference managed by the Lovecraft Arts and Sciences organization, began to be held in 2013.

History 
Starting in the early 1970s, a body of scholarly work began to emerge around H. P. Lovecraft's life and works. Referred to as Lovecraft studies, its proponents sought to establish Lovecraft as a significant author in the American literary canon. This can be traced to August Derleth's preservation and dissemination of Lovecraft's fiction, non-fiction, and letters through Arkham House. S. T. Joshi, a major scholar, credits the development of the field to this process. However, it was marred by low quality editions and misinterpretations of Lovecraft's worldview. For example, Derleth incorrectly argued that there was a dichotomy between the good "Elder Gods" and the evil "Old Ones" in Lovecraft's fiction, the expulsion of these Old Ones paralleled Christian theology, the beings in the stories were elementals, and Lovecraft's stories could be clearly divided into sets. Fritz Leiber, Matthew H. Onderdonk, and George T. Wetzel were among the early critics who were active during and before the 1970s. Their primary actions as critics was to oppose the statements of negative critics, including Edmund Wilson. After Derleth's death in 1971, the scholarship entered a new phase. There was a push to create a book-length biography of Lovecraft. L. Sprague de Camp, a science fiction scholar, wrote the first major one in 1975. This biography was criticized by early Lovecraft scholars for its lack of scholarly merit and its lack of sympathy for its subject. Frank Belknap Long, one of Lovecraft's friends and correspondents, wrote his own book in an attempt to counteract the effects of this biography. Despite the criticism, de Camp's biography played a significant role in Lovecraft's literary rise. It exposed Lovecraft to the mainstream of American literary criticism.

During the late 1970s and early 1980s, there was a division in the field between the "Derlethian traditionalists" who wished to interpret Lovecraft through the lens of fantasy literature and the newer scholars who wished to place greater attention on the entirety of his corpus. This process was begun by Richard L. Tierney, who challenged August Derleth's interpretation of Lovecraft's fiction in a 1972 paper titled "The Derleth Mythos". Dirk W. Mosig furthered this line of thought and Derleth's interpretation ceased to be mainstream amongst the scholars. The first Lovecraftian scholarly journal, Lovecraft Studies, began to be published in 1979. It served as the main outlet for scholarship in the field and was edited by S. T. Joshi. The 1980s and 1990s saw a further proliferation of the field. This period saw the rise of the "Providence Pals", a group of scholarly fans who were the central figures in the field during those decades. They included S. T. Joshi, Donald R. Burleson, Robert M. Price, and Peter Cannon. These scholars contributed to various advancements in the field, including the publication of corrected versions of H. P. Lovecraft's stories, essays, and writings. Price began to publish his own scholarly fanzine, Crypt of Cthulhu in 1981. It publishes both scholarship and fiction. The 1990 H. P. Lovecraft Centennial Conference and the republication of older essays in An Epicure in the Terrible served as bases for then-future studies. The 1990 centennial also saw the installation of the "H. P. Lovecraft Memorial Plaque" in a garden adjoining John Hay Library, that features a portrait by silhouettist E. J. Perry. Following this, in 1996, S. T. Joshi wrote his own biography of Lovecraft. This biography was met with positive reviews and became the main biography in the field. It has since been superseded by his expanded edition of the book, I am Providence in 2010.

Lovecraft's improving literary reputation has caused his works to receive increased attention by both classics publishers and scholarly fans. His works have been published by several different series of literary classics. Penguin Classics published three volumes of Lovecraft's works between 1999 and 2004. These volumes were edited by S. T. Joshi. Barnes & Noble would publish their own volume of Lovecraft's complete fiction in 2008. The Library of America published a volume of Lovecraft's works in 2005. The publishing of these volumes represented a reversal of the traditional judgment that Lovecraft was not part of the Western canon. Lovecraft Studies experienced a hiatus in 2006 and was replaced by the Lovecraft Annual a year later. Meanwhile, the biannual NecronomiCon Providence convention was first held in 2013. Its purpose is to serve as a fan and scholarly convention that discusses both Lovecraft and the wider field of weird fiction. It is organized by the Lovecraft Arts and Sciences organization and is held on the weekend of Lovecraft's birth. That July, the Providence City Council designated the "H. P. Lovecraft Memorial Square" and installed a commemorative sign at the intersection of Angell and Prospect streets, near the author's former residences.

See also 
Lovecraft fandom

Citations

General and cited sources

External links 
 The H. P. Lovecraft Archive
 The H. P. Lovecraft Historical Society
 Lovecraft Annual
 Lovecraft Studies
 Crypt of Cthulhu

H. P. Lovecraft
Reception of writers